Calvin Wayne Sandbeck (born January 28, 1956) is an American former professional ice hockey player who played in the World Hockey Association (WHA). Drafted in the fifth round of the 1976 NHL Amateur Draft by the California Golden Seals, Sandbeck opted to play in the WHA after being selected by the Calgary Cowboys in the tenth round of the 1976 WHA Amateur Draft. He played parts of two WHA seasons for the Edmonton Oilers.

References

External links

1956 births
American men's ice hockey defensemen
Calgary Cowboys draft picks
California Golden Seals draft picks
Dallas Black Hawks players
Denver Pioneers men's ice hockey players
Edmonton Oilers (WHA) players
Ice hockey players from Minnesota
Living people
Oklahoma City Stars players
People from International Falls, Minnesota